

Events

Pre-1600
1309 – Pope Clement V imposes excommunication and interdiction on Venice, and a general prohibition of all commercial intercourse with Venice, which had seized on Ferrara, a papal fiefdom.
1329 – Pope John XXII issues his In Agro Dominico condemning some writings of Meister Eckhart as heretical.
1513 – Spanish explorer Juan Ponce de León reaches the northern end of The Bahamas on his first voyage to Florida.

1601–1900
1625 – Charles I becomes King of England, Scotland and Ireland as well as claiming the title King of France.
1638 – The first of four destructive Calabrian earthquakes strikes southern Italy. Measuring magnitude 6.8 and assigned a Mercalli intensity of XI, it kills 10,000–30,000 people.
1782 – The Second Rockingham ministry assumes office in Great Britain and begins negotiations to end the American War of Independence.
1794 – The United States Government establishes a permanent navy and authorizes the building of six frigates.
1809 – Peninsular War: A combined Franco-Polish force defeats the Spanish in the Battle of Ciudad Real.
1814 – War of 1812: In central Alabama, U.S. forces under General Andrew Jackson defeat the Creek at the Battle of Horseshoe Bend.
1836 – Texas Revolution: On the orders of General Antonio López de Santa Anna, the Mexican Army massacres 342 Texian Army POWs at Goliad, Texas.
1866 – President of the United States of America Andrew Johnson vetoes the Civil Rights Act of 1866. His veto is overridden by Congress and the bill passes into law on April 9. 
1871 – The first international rugby football match, when Scotland defeats England in Edinburgh at Raeburn Place.
1884 – A mob in Cincinnati, Ohio, United States attacks members of a jury which had returned a verdict of manslaughter in what was seen as a clear case of murder; over the next few days the mob would riot and eventually destroy the courthouse.
1886 – Geronimo, Apache warrior, surrenders to the U.S. Army, ending the main phase of the Apache Wars.
1899 – Emilio Aguinaldo leads Filipino forces for the only time during the Philippine–American War at the Battle of Marilao River.

1901–present
1901 – Philippine–American War: Emilio Aguinaldo, leader of the First Philippine Republic, is captured by the Americans. 
1915 – Typhoid Mary, the first healthy carrier of disease ever identified in the United States, is put in quarantine for the second time, where she would remain for the rest of her life.
1918 – The National Council of Bessarabia proclaims union with the Kingdom of Romania.
1938 – Second Sino-Japanese War: The Battle of Taierzhuang begins, resulting several weeks later in the war's first major Chinese victory over Japan.
1941 – World War II: Yugoslav Air Force officers topple the pro-Axis government in a bloodless coup.
1942 – The Holocaust: Nazi Germany and Vichy France begin the deportation of 65,000 Jews from Drancy internment camp to German extermination camps.
1943 – World War II: Battle of the Komandorski Islands: In the Aleutian Islands the battle begins when United States Navy forces intercept Japanese attempting to reinforce a garrison at Kiska.
1945 – World War II: Operation Starvation, the aerial mining of Japan's ports and waterways begins. Argentina declares war on the Axis Powers.
1958 – Nikita Khrushchev becomes Chairman of the Council of Ministers of the Soviet Union.
1964 – The Good Friday earthquake, the most powerful earthquake recorded in North American history at a magnitude of 9.2 strikes Southcentral Alaska, killing 125 people and inflicting massive damage to the city of Anchorage.
1975 – Construction of the Trans-Alaska Pipeline System begins.
1976 – The first section of the Washington Metro opens to the public. 
1977 – Tenerife airport disaster: Two Boeing 747 airliners collide on a foggy runway on Tenerife in the Canary Islands, killing 583 (all 248 on KLM and 335 on Pan Am). Sixty-one survived on the Pan Am flight. This is the deadliest aviation accident in history.
1980 – The Norwegian oil platform Alexander L. Kielland collapses in the North Sea, killing 123 of its crew of 212.
1981 – The Solidarity movement in Poland stages a warning strike, in which at least 12 million Poles walk off their jobs for four hours.
1986 – A car bomb explodes outside Russell Street Police HQ in Melbourne, Australia, killing one police officer and injuring 21 people.
1990 – The United States begins broadcasting anti-Castro propaganda to Cuba on TV Martí.
1993 – Jiang Zemin is appointed President of the People's Republic of China.
  1993   – Italian former minister and Christian Democracy leader Giulio Andreotti is accused of mafia allegiance by the tribunal of Palermo.
1998 – The Food and Drug Administration approves Viagra for use as a treatment for erectile dysfunction, the first pill to be approved for this condition in the United States.
1999 – Kosovo War: An American Lockheed F-117A Nighthawk is shot down by a Yugoslav Army SAM, the first and only Nighthawk to be lost in combat.
2000 – A Phillips Petroleum plant explosion in Pasadena, Texas kills one person and injures 71 others.
2002 – Passover massacre: A Palestinian suicide bomber kills 29 people at a Passover seder in Netanya, Israel.
  2002   – Nanterre massacre: In Nanterre, France, a gunman opens fire at the end of a town council meeting, resulting in the deaths of eight councilors; 19 other people are injured.
2004 – , a decommissioned Leander-class frigate, is sunk as an artificial reef off Cornwall, the first of its kind in Europe.
2009 – The dam forming Situ Gintung, an artificial lake in Indonesia, fails, killing at least 99 people.
2014 – Philippines signs a peace accord with the largest Muslim rebel group, the Moro Islamic Liberation Front, ending decades of conflict.
2015 – Al-Shabab militants attack and temporarily occupy a Mogadishu hotel leaving at least 20 people dead.
2016 – A suicide blast in Gulshan-e-Iqbal Park, Lahore claims over 70 lives and leaves almost 300 others injured. The target of the bombing are Christians celebrating Easter.
2020 – North Macedonia becomes the 30th member of NATO.

Births

Pre-1600
1401 – Albert III, duke of Bavaria (d. 1460)
1416 – Francis of Paola, Italian friar and saint, founded Order of the Minims (d. 1507)
1509 – Wolrad II, Count of Waldeck-Eisenberg, German nobleman (d. 1578)
1546 – Johannes Piscator, German theologian (d. 1625)

1601–1900
1627 – Stephen Fox, English politician (d. 1716)
1676 – Francis II Rákóczi, Hungarian prince (b. 1676)
1679 – Domenico Lalli, Italian poet and librettist (d. 1741)
1681 – Joaquín Fernández de Portocarrero, Spanish-Italian cardinal (d. 1760)
1702 – Johann Ernst Eberlin, German organist and composer (d. 1762)
1710 – Joseph Abaco, Belgian cellist and composer (d. 1805)
1712 – Claude Bourgelat, French surgeon and author (d. 1779)
1714 – Francesco Antonio Zaccaria, Italian historian and theologian (d. 1795)
1724 – Jane Colden, American botanist and author (d. 1766)
1745 – Lindley Murray, American-English Quaker and grammarian (d. 1826)
1746 – Michael Bruce, Scottish poet and composer (d. 1767)
  1746   – Carlo Buonaparte, Corsican-French lawyer and politician (d. 1785)
1765 – Franz Xaver von Baader, German philosopher and theologian (d. 1841)
1781 – Alexander Vostokov, Estonian-Russian philologist and academic (d. 1864)
1784 – Sándor Kőrösi Csoma, Hungarian philologist, orientalist, and author (d. 1842)
1785 – Louis XVII of France (d. 1795)
1797 – Alfred de Vigny, French author, poet, and playwright (d. 1863)
1801 – Alexander Barrow, American lawyer and politician (d. 1846)
1802 – Charles-Mathias Simons, German-Luxembourger jurist and politician, 3rd Prime Minister of Luxembourg (d. 1874)
1809 – Georges-Eugène Haussmann, French engineer, urban planner, and politician (d. 1891)
1811 – Edward William Cooke, English painter and illustrator (d. 1880)
1814 – Charles Mackay, Scottish journalist, anthologist, and author (d. 1889)
1820 – Edward Augustus Inglefield, English admiral and explorer (d. 1894)
1822 – Henri Murger, French novelist and poet (d. 1861)
1824 – Virginia Minor, American women's suffrage activist (d. 1894)
1839 – John Ballance, Irish-New Zealand journalist and politician, 14th Prime Minister of New Zealand (d. 1893)
1843 – George Frederick Leycester Marshall, English colonel and entomologist (d. 1934)
1844 – Adolphus Greely, American general and explorer, Medal of Honor recipient (d. 1935)
1845 – Wilhelm Röntgen, German physicist and academic, Nobel Prize laureate (d. 1923)
  1845   – Jakob Sverdrup, Norwegian bishop and politician, Norwegian Minister of Education and Church Affairs (d. 1899)
1847 – Otto Wallach, German chemist and academic, Nobel Prize laureate (d. 1931)
1851 – Ruperto Chapí, Spanish composer, co-founded Sociedad General de Autores y Editores (d. 1909)
  1851   – Vincent d'Indy, French composer and educator (d. 1931)
1852 – Jan van Beers, Belgian painter and illustrator (d. 1927)
1854 – Giovanni Battista Grassi, Italian physician, zoologist, and entomologist (d. 1925)
1855 – William Libbey, American target shooter, colonel, mountaineer, geographer, geologist, and  archaeologist (d. 1927)
1857 – Karl Pearson, English mathematician, eugenicist, and academic (d. 1936)
1859 – George Giffen, Australian cricketer and footballer (d. 1927)
1860 – Frank Frost Abbott, American-Swiss scholar and academic (d. 1924)
1862 – Jelena Dimitrijević, Serbian short story writer, novelist, poet, traveller, social worker, feminist and polyglot (d. 1945)
  1862   – Arturo Berutti, Argentinian composer (d. 1938)
1863 – Henry Royce, English engineer and businessman, founded Rolls-Royce Limited (d. 1933)
1866 – John Allan, Australian politician, 29th Premier of Victoria (d. 1936)
1868 – Patty Hill, American songwriter and educator (d. 1946)
1869 – James McNeill, Irish politician, 2nd Governor-General of the Irish Free State (d. 1938)
  1869   – J. R. Clynes, English trade unionist and politician, Home Secretary (d. 1949)
1871 – Heinrich Mann, German author and poet (d. 1950)
  1871   – Joseph G. Morrison, American captain and Nazarene minister (d. 1939)
  1871   – Piet Aalberse, Dutch politician, Minister of Labour (d. 1948)
1875 – Albert Marquet, French painter (d. 1947)
1877 – Oscar Grégoire, Belgian water polo player and swimmer (d. 1947)
1878 – Kathleen Scott, British sculptor (d. 1947)
1879 – Sándor Garbai, Hungarian politician, 19th Prime Minister of Hungary (d. 1947)
  1879   – Miller Huggins, American baseball player and manager (d. 1929)
  1879   – Edward Steichen, Luxembourger-American painter and photographer (d. 1973)
1881 – Arkady Averchenko, Russian playwright and satirist (d. 1925)
1882 – Thomas Graham Brown, Scottish mountaineer and physiologist (d. 1965)
1883 – Marie Under, Estonian author and poet (d. 1980)
1884 – Gordon Thomson, English rower and lieutenant (d. 1953)
1885 – Julio Lozano Díaz, Honduran accountant and politician, 40th President of Honduras (d. 1957)
  1885   – Reginald Fletcher, 1st Baron Winster, English navy officer and politician, Secretary of State for Transport (d. 1961)
1886 – Sergey Kirov, Russian politician (d. 1934)
  1886   – Wladimir Burliuk, Ukrainian painter and illustrator (d. 1917)
  1886   – Ludwig Mies van der Rohe, German-American architect, designed IBM Plaza and Seagram Building (d. 1969)
1887 – Väinö Siikaniemi, Finnish javelin thrower, poet, and translator (d. 1932)
1888 – George Alfred Lawrence Hearne, English-South African cricketer (d. 1978)
1889 – Yakup Kadri Karaosmanoğlu, Egyptian-Turkish journalist, author, and politician (d. 1974)
  1889   – Leonard Mociulschi, Romanian general (d. 1979)
1890 – Harald Julin, Swedish swimmer and water polo player (d. 1967)
  1890   – Frederick Dalrymple-Hamilton, Scottish admiral (d. 1974)
1891 – Lajos Zilahy, Hungarian novelist and playwright (d. 1974)
  1891   – Klawdziy Duzh-Dushewski, Belarusian-Lithuanian architect, journalist, and diplomat, created the Flag of Belarus (d. 1959)
1892 – Ferde Grofé, American pianist and composer (d. 1972)
  1892   – Thorne Smith, American author (d. 1934)
1893 – Karl Mannheim, Hungarian-English sociologist and academic (d. 1947)
  1893   – G. Lloyd Spencer, American lieutenant and politician (d. 1981)
  1893   – George Beranger, Australian-American actor and director (d. 1973)
1894 – René Fonck, French colonel and pilot (d. 1953)
1895 – Roland Leighton, English soldier and poet (d. 1915)
1897 – Douglas Hartree, English mathematician and physicist (d. 1958)
  1897   – Fred Keating, American magician, stage and film actor (d. 1961)
1899 – Francis Ponge, French poet and author (d. 1988)
  1899   – Herbert Arthur Stuart, German-Swiss physicist and academic (d. 1974)
  1899   – Gloria Swanson, American actress and producer (d. 1983)

1901–present
1901 – Carl Barks, American illustrator and screenwriter (d. 2000)
  1901   – Erich Ollenhauer, German politician (d. 1963)
  1901   – Eisaku Satō, Japanese politician, Prime Minister of Japan, Nobel Prize laureate (d. 1975)
  1901   – Kenneth Slessor, Australian journalist and poet (d. 1971)
1902 – Sidney Buchman, American screenwriter and producer (d. 1975)
  1902   – Charles Lang, American cinematographer (d. 1998)
1903 – Leif Tronstad, Norwegian chemist and military leader (d. 1945)
  1903   – Xavier Villaurrutia, Mexican poet and playwright (d. 1950)
1905 – Leroy Carr, American singer-songwriter and pianist (d. 1935)
  1905   – Rudolf Christoph Freiherr von Gersdorff, German general (d. 1980)
  1905   – Elsie MacGill, Canadian-American author and engineer (d. 1980)
1906 – Pee Wee Russell, American clarinet player, saxophonist, and composer (d. 1969)
1909 – Golo Mann, German historian and author (d. 1994)
  1909   – Ben Webster, American saxophonist (d. 1973)
  1909   – Valery Marakou, Belarusian poet and translator (d. 1937)
1910 – Ai Qing, Chinese poet and author (d. 1996)
1911 – Veronika Tushnova, Russian poet and physician (d. 1965)
1912 – James Callaghan, English lieutenant and politician, Prime Minister of the United Kingdom (d. 2005)
1913 – Theodor Dannecker, German SS officer (d. 1945)
1914 – Richard Denning, American actor (d. 1998)
  1914   – Budd Schulberg, American author, screenwriter, and producer (d. 2009)
1915 – Robert Lockwood, Jr., American guitarist (d. 2006)
1917 – Cyrus Vance, American lawyer and politician, 57th United States Secretary of State (d. 2002)
1920 – Colin Rowe, English-American architect, theorist and academic (d. 1999)
1921 – Phil Chess, Czech-American record producer, co-founded Chess Records (d. 2016)
  1921   – Moacir Barbosa Nascimento, Brazilian footballer and coach (d. 2000)
  1921   – Harold Nicholas, American actor and dancer (d. 2000)
1922 – Dick King-Smith, English author (d. 2011)
  1922   – Stefan Wul, French author and surgeon (d. 2003)
  1922   – Jules Olitski, Ukrainian-American painter, printmaker, and sculptor (d. 2007)
1923 – Shūsaku Endō, Japanese author (d. 1996)
  1923   – Louis Simpson, Jamaican-American poet, translator, and academic (d. 2012)
1924 – Sarah Vaughan, American singer (d. 1990)
  1924   – Ian Black, Scottish international footballer and lawn bowls player (d. 2012)
  1924   – Margaret K. Butler, American mathematician and computer programmer (d. 2013)
1926 – Frank O'Hara, American writer (d. 1966)
1927 – Sylvia Anderson, English voice actress, screenwriter, and producer (d. 2016)
  1927   – Anthony Lewis, American journalist and academic (d. 2013)
  1927   – Mstislav Rostropovich, Russian cellist and conductor (d. 2007)
1928 – Jean Dotto, French cyclist (d. 2000)
1929 – Anne Ramsey, American actress (d. 1988)
  1929   – Reg Evans, Australian actor (d. 2009)
1930 – Daniel Spoerri, Romanian-Swiss photographer, writer and artist
1931 – David Janssen, American actor and screenwriter (d. 1980)
1932 – Junior Parker, American singer and harmonica player (d. 1971)
  1932   – Bailey Olter, Micronesian politician, 3rd President of the Federated States of Micronesia (d. 1999)
1933 – Lê Văn Hưng, South Vietnamese Brigadier general (d. 1975)
1934 – István Csurka, Hungarian journalist, author, and politician (d. 2012)
  1934   – Ioannis Palaiokrassas, Greek politician (d. 2021) 
1935 – Stanley Rother, American Roman Catholic priest and missionary (d. 1981)
  1935   – Julian Glover, English actor
1936 – Malcolm Goldstein, American violinist and composer
1937 – Alan Hawkshaw, English keyboard player and songwriter 
1939 – Jay Kim, South Korean-American engineer and politician
  1939   – Cale Yarborough, American race car driver and businessman
1940 – Sandro Munari, Italian race car driver
  1940   – Austin Pendleton, American actor, director, and playwright
1941 – Ivan Gašparovič, Slovak lawyer and politician, 3rd President of Slovakia
  1941   – Liese Prokop, Austrian pentathlete and politician, Austrian Minister of the Interior (d. 2006)
1942 – Michael Jackson, English journalist and author (d. 2007)
  1942   – John Sulston, English biologist and academic, Nobel Prize laureate (d. 2018) 
  1942   – Michael York, English actor 
1943 – Mike Curtis, American football player and coach (d. 2020)
1944 – Jesse Brown, American marine and politician, 2nd United States Secretary of Veterans Affairs (d. 2002)
  1944   – Bryan Campbell, Canadian ice hockey player 
1946 – Michael Aris, Cuban-English author and academic (d. 1999)
1947 – Oliver Friggieri, Maltese author, critic, poet and philosopher (d. 2020)
  1947   – Brian Jones, English balloonist and pilot
  1947   – Walt Mossberg, American journalist
  1947   – Doug Wilkerson, American football player (d. 2021)
1948 – Jens-Peter Bonde, Danish lawyer and politician (d. 2021)
1950 – Tony Banks, English keyboardist and songwriter 
  1950   – Petros Efthymiou, Greek academic and politician, Greek Minister of Culture, Education and Religious Affairs
  1950   – Maria Ewing, American soprano (d. 2022)
  1950   – Terry Yorath, Welsh international footballer and international manager
1951 – Andrei Kozyrev, Belgian-Russian politician and diplomat, Minister of Foreign Affairs for Russia
  1951   – Chris Stewart, English musician and author
1952 – Annemarie Moser-Pröll, Austrian skier
  1952   – Maria Schneider, French actress (d. 2011)
1953 – Herman Ponsteen, Dutch cyclist
1954 – Gerard Batten, English lawyer and politician
1955 – Patrick McCabe, Irish writer
  1955   – Lefteris Pantazis, Greek singer 
  1955   – Mariano Rajoy, Spanish lawyer and politician, Prime Minister of Spain
  1955   – Susan Neiman, American-German philosopher and author
1956 – Leung Kwok-hung, Hong Kong activist and politician
  1956   – Thomas Wassberg, Swedish cross country skier
1957 – Kostas Vasilakakis, Greek footballer and manager
  1957   – Stephen Dillane, English actor
1958 – Didier de Radiguès, Belgian race car driver and motorcycle racer 
1959 – Andrew Farriss, Australian rock musician and multi-instrumentalist
  1959   – Ivan Savvidis, Russian-Greek oligarch and politician 
1960 – Hans Pflügler, German footballer
  1960   – Renato Russo, Brazilian singer-songwriter and guitarist (d. 1996)
1961 – Ellery Hanley, English rugby league player and coach
  1961   – Tony Rominger, Swiss professional cyclist
1962 – Jann Arden, Canadian singer-songwriter
  1962   – Brett French, Australian rugby league player  
  1962   – Rob Hollink, Dutch poker player
  1962   – John O'Farrell, English journalist and author
  1962   – Brad Wright, American-Spanish basketball player
  1962   – Kevin J. Anderson, American science fiction writer
1963 – Cory Blackwell, American basketball player
  1963   – Randall Cunningham, American football player, coach, and pastor
  1963   – Georgios Katrougalos, Greek jurist and politician
  1963   – Filippos Sachinidis, Greek-Canadian economist and politician
  1963   – Gary Stevens, English-Australian footballer and physiotherapist
  1963   – Quentin Tarantino, American director, producer, screenwriter and actor
  1963   – Xuxa, Brazilian actress, singer, businesswoman and television presenter
1965 – Gregor Foitek, Swiss race car driver
1966 – Žarko Paspalj, Serbian basketball player
1967 – Talisa Soto, American actress
1968 – Irina Belova, Russian heptathlete
1969 – Gianluigi Lentini, Italian footballer and manager
  1969   – Pauley Perrette, American actress
  1969   – Mariah Carey, American singer-songwriter, producer, and actress
1970 – Leila Pahlavi, Princess of Iran (d. 2001)
  1970   – Derek Aucoin, Canadian baseball player (d. 2020)
  1970   – Brent Fitz, Canadian-American multi-instrumentalist and recording artist
  1970   – Jarrod McCracken, New Zealand rugby league player
  1970   – Elizabeth Mitchell, American actress
  1970   – Uwe Rosenberg, German game designer, created Bohnanza
1971 – David Coulthard, Scottish race car driver and sportscaster
  1971   – Nathan Fillion, Canadian actor 
1972 – Jimmy Floyd Hasselbaink, Surinamese-Dutch footballer, coach, and manager
  1972   – Charlie Haas, American professional wrestler
1973 – Roger Telemachus, South African cricketer
1974 – Marek Citko, Polish footballer and manager
  1974   – George Koumantarakis, Greek-South African footballer
  1974   – Gaizka Mendieta, Spanish footballer
1975 – Andrew Blowers, New Zealand rugby player
  1975   – Kim Felton, Australian golfer
  1975   – Fergie, American singer-songwriter, dancer, and actress 
  1975   – Christian Fiedler, German footballer and manager
1976 – Roberta Anastase, Romanian politician, 57th President of the Chamber of Deputies of Romania
  1976   – Danny Fortson, American basketball player
  1976   – Adrian Anca, Romanian footballer
1977 – Vítor Meira, Brazilian race car driver
  1977   – Ioannis Melissanidis, Greek artistic gymnast 
1978 – Gabriel Paraschiv, Romanian footballer
  1978   – Marius Bakken, Norwegian runner
  1978   – Amélie Cocheteux, French tennis player
1979 – Tom Palmer, English rugby union player
  1979   – Mohsen Moeini,  Iranian author and director
  1979   – Imran Tahir, Pakistani-South African cricketer
  1979   – Jennifer Wilson, Zimbabwean-South African field hockey player
1980 – Sean Ryan, American football player
  1980   – Michaela Paštiková, Czech tennis player
  1980   – Maksim Shevchenko, Kazakhstani footballer
1981 – Terry McFlynn, Irish footballer
  1981   – Akhil Kumar, Indian boxer
  1981   – Jukka Keskisalo, Finnish runner
  1981   – Hilda Kibet, Kenyan runner
  1981   – Cacau, Brazilian-German footballer
1982 – Shawn Beveney, Guyanese footballer
1983 – Yuliya Golubchikova, Russian pole vaulter
  1983   – Vasily Koshechkin, Russian ice hockey player
  1983   – Román Martínez, Argentinian footballer
1984 – Adam Ashley-Cooper, Australian rugby player
  1984   – Ben Franks, Australian-born New Zealand rugby player
  1984   – Brett Holman, Australian footballer
1985 – Dustin Byfuglien, American ice hockey player
  1985   – Danny Vukovic, Australian footballer
1986 – Manuel Neuer, German footballer
1987 – Jefferson Bernárdez, Honduran footballer
  1987   – Samuel Francis, Nigerian-Qatari sprinter
  1987   – Polina Gagarina, Russian singer-songwriter
  1987   – Buster Posey, American baseball player
1988 – Jessie J, English singer-songwriter
  1988   – Atsuto Uchida, Japanese footballer
  1988   – Brenda Song, American actress
  1988   – Mauro Goicoechea, Uruguayan footballer
  1988   – Holliday Grainger, English actress
1989 – Matt Harvey, American baseball player
  1989   – Camilla Lees, New Zealand netball player
1990 – Erdin Demir, Swedish-Turkish footballer
  1990   – Ben Hunt, Australian rugby league player
  1990   – Nicolas Nkoulou, Cameroonian footballer
  1990   – Luca Zuffi, Swiss footballer
  1990   – Kimbra, New Zealand musician
  1990   – Brodha V, Indian Rapper and Music Producer
1992 – Marc Muniesa, Spanish footballer
1995 – Bill Tuiloma, New Zealand footballer
1998 – Giannis Bouzoukis, Greek footballer 
2002 – Daria Snigur, Ukrainian tennis player

Deaths

Pre-1600
 710 – Rupert of Salzburg, Austrian bishop and saint (b. 660)
 853 – Haymo of Halberstadt, German bishop and author (b. 778)
 913 – Du Xiao, chancellor of Later Liang 
   913   – Zhang empress of Later Liang
 916 – Alduin I, Frankish nobleman
 965 – Arnulf I, Count of Flanders (born c. 890)
 973 – Hermann Billung, Frankish lieutenant (b. 900)
1045 – Ali ibn Ahmad al-Jarjara'i, Fatimid vizier
1184 – Giorgi III, King of Georgia
1248 – Maud Marshal, English countess (b. 1192)
1378 – Pope Gregory XI (b. 1336)
1462 – Vasily II of Moscow (b. 1415)
1472 – Janus Pannonius, Hungarian bishop and poet (b. 1434) 
1482 – Mary of Burgundy, Sovereign Duchess regnant of Burgundy, married to Maximilian I, Holy Roman Emperor (b. 1457)
1564 – Lütfi Pasha, Turkish historian and politician, Grand Vizier of the Ottoman Empire (b. 1488)
1572 – Girolamo Maggi, Italian polymath (b. c. 1523)
1598 – Theodor de Bry, Belgian-German engraver, goldsmith, and publisher (b. 1528)

1601–1900
1613 – Sigismund Báthory (b. 1573)
1615 – Margaret of Valois (b. 1553)
1621 – Benedetto Giustiniani, Italian cardinal (b. 1554)
1624 – Ulrik of Denmark, Danish prince-bishop (b. 1578)
1625 – James VI and I of the United Kingdom (b. 1566)
1635 – Robert Naunton, English politician (b. 1563)
1676 – Bernardino de Rebolledo, Spanish poet, soldier, and diplomat (b. 1597)
1679 – Abraham Mignon, Dutch painter (b. 1640)
1697 – Simon Bradstreet, English businessman and politician, 20th Governor of the Massachusetts Bay Colony (b. 1603)
1729 – Leopold, Duke of Lorraine (b. 1679)
1757 – Johann Stamitz, Czech violinist and composer (b. 1717)
1770 – Giovanni Battista Tiepolo, Italian painter (b. 1696)
1848 – Gabriel Bibron, French zoologist and herpetologist (b. 1805)
1849 – Archibald Acheson, 2nd Earl of Gosford, Irish-Canadian politician, 35th Governor General of Canada (b. 1776)
1850 – Wilhelm Beer, Prussian astronomer and banker (b. 1797)
1864 – Jean-Jacques Ampère, French philologist and academic (b. 1800)
1869 – James Harper, American publisher and politician, 65th Mayor of New York City (b. 1795)
1875 – Juan Crisóstomo Torrico, Peruvian soldier and politician, President of Peru (b. 1808)
  1875   – Edgar Quinet, French historian and academic (b. 1803)
1878 – George Gilbert Scott, English architect, designed the Albert Memorial and St Mary's Cathedral (b. 1811)
1886 – Henry Taylor, English poet and playwright (b. 1800)
1889 – John Bright, English politician, Secretary of State for Business, Innovation and Skills (b. 1811)
1890 – Carl Jacob Löwig, German chemist and academic (b. 1803)
1897 – Andreas Anagnostakis, Greek ophthalmologist, physician, and educator (b. 1826) 
1898 – Syed Ahmad Khan, Indian philosopher and activist (b. 1817)
1900 – Joseph A. Campbell, American businessman, founded the Campbell Soup Company (b. 1817)

1901–present
1910 – Alexander Emanuel Agassiz, Swiss-American ichthyologist, zoologist, and engineer (b. 1835)
1913 – Richard Montgomery Gano, American minister, physician, and general (b. 1830)
1918 – Henry Adams, American journalist, historian, and author (b. 1838)
  1918   – Martin Sheridan, Irish-American discus thrower and jumper (b. 1881)
1921 – Harry Barron, English general and politician, 16th Governor of Western Australia (b. 1847)
1922 – Nikolay Sokolov, Russian composer and educator (b. 1859)
1923 – James Dewar, Scottish chemist and physicist (b. 1842)
1925 – Carl Neumann, German mathematician and academic (b. 1832)
1926 – Kick Kelly, American baseball player, manager, and umpire (b. 1856)
  1926   – Georges Vézina, Canadian ice hockey player (b. 1887)
1927 – Joe Start, American baseball player and manager (b. 1842)
  1927   – Klaus Berntsen, Danish politician, Prime Minister of Denmark (b. 1844)
1928 – Leslie Stuart, English organist and composer (b. 1863)
1931 – Arnold Bennett, English author and playwright (b. 1867)
1934 – Francis William Reitz, South African lawyer and politician, 5th State President of the Orange Free State (b. 1844)
1938 – William Stern, German-American psychologist and philosopher (b. 1871)
1940 – Michael Joseph Savage, Australian-New Zealand politician, 23rd Prime Minister of New Zealand (b. 1872)
1942 – Julio González, Catalan sculptor and painter (b. 1876)
1943 – George Monckton-Arundell, 8th Viscount Galway, English politician, 5th Governor-General of New Zealand (b. 1882)
1945 – Vincent Hugo Bendix, American engineer and businessman, founded Bendix Corporation (b. 1881)
  1945   – Halid Ziya Uşaklıgil, Turkish author, poet, and playwright (b. 1866)
1946 – Karl Groos, German psychologist and philosopher (b. 1861)
1949 – Elisheva Bikhovski, Israeli-Russian poet (b. 1888)
1952 – Kiichiro Toyoda, Japanese businessman, founded Toyota (b. 1894)
1956 – Évariste Lévi-Provençal, French orientalist and historian (b. 1894)
1958 – Leon C. Phillips, American lawyer and politician, 11th Governor of Oklahoma (b. 1890)
1960 – Gregorio Marañón, Spanish physician, philosopher, and author (b. 1887)
1967 – Jaroslav Heyrovský, Czech chemist and academic, Nobel Prize laureate (b. 1890)
1968 – Yuri Gagarin, Russian colonel, pilot, and astronaut (b. 1934)
  1968   – Vladimir Seryogin, Russian soldier and pilot (b. 1922)
1972 – Lorenzo Wright, American athlete (b. 1926)
1973 – Mikhail Kalatozov, Georgian-Russian director, screenwriter, and cinematographer (b. 1903)
1974 – Eduardo Santos, Colombian journalist, lawyer, and politician, 15th President of Colombia (b. 1888)
1975 – Arthur Bliss, English conductor and composer (b. 1891)
1976 – Georg August Zinn, German lawyer and politician, Minister President of Hesse (b. 1901)
1977 – Shirley Graham Du Bois, American author, playwright, and composer (b. 1896)
  1977   – Diana Hyland, American actress (b. 1936)
  1977   – Jacob Veldhuyzen van Zanten, Dutch airline pilot (b. 1927)
1978 – Nat Bailey, Canadian businessman, founded the White Spot (b. 1902)
  1978   – Kunwar Digvijay Singh, Indian field hockey (b. 1922)
  1978   – Sverre Farstad, Norwegian speed skater (b. 1920)
1980 – Steve Fisher, American author and screenwriter (b. 1912)
1981 – Jakob Ackeret, Swiss engineer and academic (b. 1898)
1982 – Fazlur Khan, Bangladeshi-American engineer and architect, designed the John Hancock Center and Willis Tower (b. 1929)
1987 – William Bowers, American journalist and screenwriter (b. 1916)
1988 – Charles Willeford, American author, poet, and critic (b. 1919)
1989 – May Allison, American actress (b. 1890)
  1989   – Malcolm Cowley,  American novelist, poet, and literary critic (b. 1898)
1990 – Percy Beard, American hurdler and coach (b. 1908)
1991 – Aldo Ray, American actor (b. 1926)
1992 – Colin Gibson, English footballer (b. 1923)
  1992   – Lang Hancock, Australian businessman (b. 1909)
  1992   – James E. Webb, American colonel and politician, 16th Under Secretary of State (b. 1906)
1993 – Kamal Hassan Ali, Egyptian general and politician, Prime Minister of Egypt (b. 1921)
  1993   – Paul László, Hungarian-American architect and interior designer (b. 1900)
1994 – Elisabeth Schmid, German archaeologist and osteologist (b. 1912)
  1994   – Lawrence Wetherby, American lawyer and politician, 48th Governor of Kentucky (b. 1908)
1995 – René Allio, French director and screenwriter (b. 1924)
1997 – Lane Dwinell, American businessman and politician, 69th Governor of New Hampshire (b. 1906)
  1997   – Ella Maillart, Swiss skier, sailor, field hockey player, and photographer (b. 1903)
1998 – David McClelland, American psychologist and academic (b. 1917)
1999 – Michael Aris, Cuban-English author and academic (b. 1946)
2000 – George Allen, Canadian ice hockey player and coach (b. 1914)
  2000   – Ian Dury, English singer-songwriter and actor (b. 1942)
2002 – Milton Berle, American comedian and actor (b. 1908)
  2002   – Dudley Moore, English actor (b. 1935)
  2002   – Billy Wilder, Austrian-born American director, producer, and screenwriter (b. 1906)
2003 – Edwin Carr, New Zealand composer and educator (b. 1926)
2004 – Robert Merle, French author (b. 1909)
2005 – Wilfred Gordon Bigelow, Canadian soldier and surgeon (b. 1913)
2006 – Dan Curtis, American director and producer (b. 1928)
  2006   – Stanisław Lem, Ukrainian-Polish author (b. 1921)
  2006   – Rudolf Vrba, Czech Holocaust survivor and educator (b. 1924)
  2006   – Neil Williams, English cricketer (b. 1962)
2007 – Nancy Adams, New Zealand botanist and illustrator (b. 1926)
  2007   – Paul Lauterbur, American chemist and academic, Nobel Prize laureate (b. 1929)
2008 – Jean-Marie Balestre, French businessman (b. 1921)
2009 – Irving R. Levine, American journalist and author (b. 1922)
2010 – Dick Giordano, American illustrator (b. 1932)
2011 – Clement Arrindell, Nevisian judge and politician, 1st Governor-General of Saint Kitts and Nevis (b. 1931)
  2011   – Farley Granger, American actor (b. 1925)
2012 – Adrienne Rich, American poet, essayist and feminist (b. 1929)
2013 – Hjalmar Andersen, Norwegian speed skater (b. 1923)
  2013   – Yvonne Brill, Canadian-American scientist and engineer (b. 1924)
  2013   – Fay Kanin, American screenwriter and producer (b. 1917)
2014 – Richard N. Frye, American scholar and academic (b. 1920)
  2014   – James R. Schlesinger, American economist and politician, 12th United States Secretary of Defense and first United States Secretary of Energy (b. 1929)
2015 – Johnny Helms, American trumpet player, bandleader, and educator (b. 1935)
  2015   – T. Sailo, Indian soldier and politician, 2nd Chief Minister of Mizoram (b. 1922)
2016 – Mother Angelica, American Roman Catholic religious leader and media personality (b. 1923)
2018 – Bert Nievera, Filipino-American singer (b. 1936)

Holidays and observances
Christian feast day:
Alexander, a Pannonian soldier, martyred in 3rd century.
Amador of Portugal
Augusta of Treviso
Charles Henry Brent (Episcopal Church (USA))
Gelasius, Archbishop of Armagh
John of Egypt
Philetus
Romulus of Nîmes, a Benedictine abbot, martyred c. 730.
Rupert of Salzburg
Zanitas and Lazarus of Persia
March 27 (Eastern Orthodox liturgics)
Armed Forces Day (Myanmar)
Day of the Union of Bessarabia with Romania (Romania)
World Theatre Day (International)

References

External links

 BBC: On This Day
 
 Historical Events on March 27

Days of the year
March